Greater Poland, often known by its Polish name Wielkopolska, is a  historical region of west-central Poland. Its chief and largest city is Poznań followed by Kalisz, the oldest city in Poland.

The boundaries of Greater Poland have varied somewhat throughout history. Since the Middle Ages, Wielkopolska proper has been split into the Poznań and Kalisz voivodeships. In the wider sense, it also encompassed Sieradz, Łęczyca, Brześć Kujawski and Inowrocław voivodeships, which were situated further eastward. After the Partitions of Poland at the end of the 18th century, Greater Poland was incorporated into Prussia as the Grand Duchy of Posen. The region in the proper sense roughly coincides with the present-day Greater Poland Voivodeship.

Like the historical regions of Pomerania, Silesia, Mazovia or Lesser Poland, the Greater Poland region possesses its own distinctive folk costumes, architecture, cuisine, dialect and other traditions that differ from other parts of Poland.

Name 

Because Greater Poland was the settlement area of the Polans and the core of the early Polish state, the region was at times simply called "Poland" (Latin ). The more specific name is first recorded in the Latin form  in 1257 and in Polish  in 1449. Its original meaning was the Older Poland to contrast with Lesser Poland (Polish , Latin ), a region in south-eastern Poland with its capital at Kraków that later became the main centre of the state.

Geography 
Greater Poland comprises much of the area drained by the Warta River and its tributaries, including the Noteć River. The region is distinguished from Lesser Poland with the lowland landscape, and from both Lesser Poland and Mazovia with its numerous lakes. In the wider sense, it has almost , and 7 million inhabitants.

The region's main metropolis is Poznań, near the centre of the region, on the Warta. Other cities are Kalisz to the south-east, Konin to the east, Piła to the north, Ostrów Wielkopolski to the south-east, Gniezno (the earliest capital of Poland) to the north-east, and Leszno to the south-west.

The region also contains part of Drawa National Park, and several designated Landscape Parks. For example, the Rogalin Landscape Park is famous for about 2000 monumental oak trees growing on the flood plain of the river Warta, among numerous ox-bow lakes.

History

Greater Poland formed the heart of the 10th-century early Polish state, sometimes being called the "cradle of Poland". Poznań and Gniezno were early centres of royal power, but following devastation of the region by pagan rebellion in the 1030s, and the invasion of Bretislaus I of Bohemia in 1038, the capital was moved by Casimir I the Restorer from Gniezno to Kraków.

In the Testament of Bolesław III Wrymouth, which initiated the period of fragmentation of Poland (1138–1320), the western part of Greater Poland (including Poznań) was granted to Mieszko III the Old. The eastern part, with Gniezno and Kalisz, was part of the Duchy of Kraków, granted to Władysław II. However, for most of the period the two parts were under a single ruler, and were known as the Duchy of Greater Poland (although at times there were separately ruled duchies of Poznań, Gniezno, Kalisz and Ujście). The region came under the control of Władysław I the Elbow-high in 1314, and thus became part of the reunited Poland of which Władyslaw was crowned king in 1320.

In the reunited kingdom, and later in the Polish–Lithuanian Commonwealth, the country came to be divided into administrative units called voivodeships. In the case of the Greater Poland region these were Poznań Voivodeship and Kalisz Voivodeship. However, this  covered a larger area than the Greater Poland region itself, also taking in Masovia and Royal Prussia. (This division of Crown Poland into two entities called Greater and Lesser Poland had its roots in the Statutes of Casimir the Great of 1346–1362, where the laws of "Greater Poland" – the northern part of the country – were codified in the Piotrków statute, with those of "Lesser Poland" in the separate Wiślica statute.)

In 1768 a new Gniezno Voivodeship was formed out of the northern part of Kalisz Voivodeship. However more far-reaching changes would come with the Partitions of Poland. In the first partition (1772), northern parts of Greater Poland along the Noteć (German ) were taken over by Prussia, becoming the Netze District. In the second partition (1793) the whole of Greater Poland was absorbed by Prussia, becoming part of the province of South Prussia. It remained so in spite of the first Greater Poland uprising (1794), part of the unsuccessful Kościuszko Uprising directed chiefly against Russia.

More successful was the Greater Poland Uprising of 1806, which led to the region's becoming part of the Napoleonic Duchy of Warsaw (forming the Poznań Department and parts of the Kalisz and Bydgoszcz Departments). However, following the Congress of Vienna in 1815, Greater Poland was again partitioned, with the western part (including Poznań) going to Prussia. The eastern part (including Kalisz) joined the Russian-controlled Kingdom of Poland, where it formed the Kalisz Voivodeship until 1837, then the Kalisz Governorate (merged into the Warsaw Governorate between 1844 and 1867).

Within the Prussian empire, western Greater Poland became the Grand Duchy of Posen (Poznań), which theoretically held some autonomy. Following an unrealized uprising in 1846, and the more substantial but still unsuccessful uprising of 1848 (during the Spring of Nations), the Grand Duchy was replaced by the Province of Posen. The authorities made efforts to Germanize the region, particularly after the founding of Germany in 1871, and from 1886 onwards the Prussian Settlement Commission was active in increasing German land ownership in formerly Polish areas.

Following the end of World War I, the Greater Poland uprising (1918–19) ensured that most of the region became part of the newly independent Polish state, forming most of Poznań Voivodeship (1921–1939). Northern and some western parts of Greater Poland remained in Germany, where they formed much of the province of Posen-West Prussia (1922–1938), whose capital was Schneidemühl (Piła). The Polish state enacted anti-German policies, copying the past Germanization policies of Prussia to undermine the region's German minority.

Following the German invasion of 1939, Greater Poland was incorporated into Nazi Germany, becoming the province called , later Reichsgau Wartheland ( being the German name for the Warta river). The Polish and Jewish population was classified by Nazis as subhuman and subjected to organized genocide, involving mass murder and ethnic cleansing, with many former officials and others considered potential enemies by the Nazis being imprisoned or executed, including at the notorious Fort VII concentration camp in Poznań. Poznań was declared a stronghold city in the closing stages of the war, being taken by the Red Army in the Battle of Poznań, which ended on 22 February 1945.

After the war, Greater Poland was fully within the Polish People's Republic, as Poznań Voivodeship. With the reforms of 1975 this was divided into smaller provinces (the voivodeships of Kalisz, Konin, Leszno and Piła, and a smaller Poznań Voivodeship). The present-day Greater Poland Voivodeship, again with Poznań as its capital, was created in 1999.

Main cities
The following table lists the cities in proper Greater Poland with a population greater than 25,000 (2015):

See also
 Greater Poland Voivodeship

References

Further reading

External links
 Information on Wielkopolska (Greater Poland) at the University at Buffalo, State University of New York
 Information about Greater Poland
 Database of business, culture, sport, motorization, tourism, and medicine, by CyberWielkopolska 

 
Historical regions in Poland
Holocaust locations in Poland